Chantelle "Chaney" Boye-Hlorkah (born 8 September 1995) is an English footballer who plays as a winger for Aston Villa in the FA WSL.

Playing career

Youth
Boye-Hlorkah began her football training at the Everton Ladies Centre of Excellence.

Club

Everton
Boye-Hlorkah made her debut for the club in 2013. In May of the 2013 season she scored her first goal for the Blues against Doncaster Rovers Belles. After Everton won the 2017 Spring Series, she was offered her first full-time contract with the first team.

Aston Villa 
In 2021 she signed a two year long contract with Aston Villa.

International 
Boye-Hlorkah has represented England at the U-19 and U-23 levels.

Career statistics 
.

Honours 
Everton
 FA Women's Cup runners-up (1): 2013-14
 FA WSL 2 Winners (1): 2017

References 

1995 births
Living people
English women's footballers
Everton F.C. (women) players
Black British sportswomen
English people of Ghanaian descent
Women's association football fullbacks
Women's association football forwards
Aston Villa W.F.C. players